Lucien Genot (born 20 April 1901, date of death unknown) was a French sports shooter. He competed in the 50 m rifle event at the 1948 Summer Olympics.

References

1901 births
Year of death missing
French male sport shooters
Olympic shooters of France
Shooters at the 1948 Summer Olympics
Sportspeople from Meurthe-et-Moselle